Barry Cowen (born 28 August 1967) is an Irish Fianna Fáil politician who has been a Teachta Dála (TD) for the Laois–Offaly constituency since the 2020 general election, and previously from 2011 to 2016 and from 2016 to 2020 for the Offaly constituency. He previously served as Minister for Agriculture, Food and the Marine from June to July 2020.

Early life 
His father Bernard Cowen was a TD, Senator and Minister of State. His grandfather Christy Cowen was an Offaly County Councillor and a member of the Fianna Fáil National Executive.

He is married with four children and is a full-time politician.

Political career 
Before his election to Dáil Éireann, he was a member of Offaly County Council for the Tullamore local electoral area since 1991.

He has served in various Fianna Fáil Front Bench roles such as Social Protection from 2011 to 2012, Spokesperson for Housing, Planning and Local Government from 2012 to 2018 and Spokesperson for Public Expenditure and Reform from 2018 to 2020.

He represented Fianna Fáil in talks on government formation in 2016 and 2020.

In July 2020, it emerged that Cowen had a conviction for drink driving. Cowen was fined €200 and was disqualified from driving for three months. The incident occurred in September 2016, after an All-Ireland football final between Dublin and Mayo. Cowen apologised for his "serious lapse of judgement".  The Garda Síochána Ombudsman Commission (Gsoc) was asked by the Gardaí to investigate the alleged leaking of information concerning Minister for Agriculture Barry Cowen's drink driving arrest. Cowen accused gardaí of criminality for leaking allegations that he attempted to evade a garda checkpoint before he was caught drink driving. Cowen admitted receiving a ban for drink drinking but denied attempting to evade gardaí. He issued a statement that the garda record was "incorrect" and suggested he would take legal action against the Sunday Times, which first reported the story. Cowen said that the leaks were a flagrant breach of criminal law and “my rights under data protection law” and that they were an "attempt to cause me the maximum personal and political harm." Fianna Fáil TD Thomas Byrne has denied that it was he who leaked news of Cowen's ban to the press. Eamon Dooley, the longest serving Fianna Fáil member of Offaly County Council, claimed that a party member with a "grudge" leaked it to the media.

On 14 July 2020, after he refused to resign the role of Minister for Agriculture, Cowen was sacked by Taoiseach, Micheál Martin, due to the controversy surrounding his conviction for drink driving. In November 2020, it was reported that a barrister was to be questioned by GSOC in relation to the leak. In 2021, GSOC searched a Garda station in Munster in relation to the leak.

In July 2021, Cowen called on Fianna Fáil to form a new "modern centre-left" alliance with the Labour Party for the next election.

See also
Families in the Oireachtas

References

External links
Barry Cowen's page on the Fianna Fáil website

 

 

 

1967 births
Living people
Alumni of the University of Galway
Barry
Fianna Fáil TDs
Irish auctioneers
Local councillors in County Offaly
Members of the 31st Dáil
Members of the 32nd Dáil
Members of the 33rd Dáil
People from Tullamore, County Offaly
Politicians from County Offaly
Ministers for Agriculture (Ireland)